Stage Fright is the 18th Our Gang short subject comedy released. The series (later known as The Little Rascals) was created by Hal Roach in 1922, and continued production until 1944.

Plot
Author Fawn Ochletree (Clara Guiol) stages a charity performance of her latest play, a Romanesque epic. The gang and other neighborhood kids are forced into starring in the play, much to the chagrin of the gang. They are unable to remember their lines, and struggle with maintaining their composure during the more serious moments of the melodrama. Finally, Jackie sets off a slew of firecrackers as the finale, scaring all involved.

Production notes
Stage Fright was remade in 1930 during the sound era as Shivering Shakespeare.

When the television rights for the original silent Pathé Exchange/Our Gang comedies were sold to National Telepix and other distributors, several episodes were retitled. This film was released into TV syndication in 1960 as "Mischief Makers" under the title The School Play. Two-thirds of the original film was included. Deleted scenes from syndication include the dance sequence with Ernie and Farina.

Cast
 Joe Cobb as Joe
 Jackie Condon as Jackie
 Mickey Daniels as Mickey
 Jack Davis as Jack
 Allen Hoskins as Farina
 Mary Kornman as Mary
 Ernie Morrison as Ernie

Additional cast
 Jannie Hoskins as Baby in audience
 Gabe Saienz as Boy at fruit stand
 Andy Samuel as Boy in audience
 Louise Tordera as Irma
 Ray Brooks as Audience Member
 Richard Daniels as Mickey's Father
 William Gillespie as Dalmar El Farov
 Helen Gilmore as Mickey's Mother
 Clara Guiol as Fawn Ochletree
 Jack Hill as Audience Member
 Sam Lufkin as Audience Member
 Charles Stevenson as Tony the Fruit Vendor

External links 
 
 

1923 films
1923 comedy films
American black-and-white films
Films directed by Robert F. McGowan
Hal Roach Studios short films
American silent short films
Our Gang films
1923 short films
1920s American films
Silent American comedy films